Virsa Singh (16 April 1933 – August 2019) was an Indian athlete. He competed in the men's long jump at the 1960 Summer Olympics.

References

External links
 

1933 births
2019 deaths
People from Bhilwara district
Athletes (track and field) at the 1960 Summer Olympics
Indian male long jumpers
Olympic athletes of India
20th-century Indian people